The 2017–18 San Jose State Spartans women's basketball team represents San Jose State University in the 2017–18 NCAA Division I women's basketball season. The Spartans are led by fifth-year head coach Jamie Craighead and play home games at the Event Center Arena as a member of the Mountain West Conference. They finished the season 7–23, 4–14 in Mountain West play to finish in last place. They lost in the first round of the Mountain West women's tournament to New Mexico.

Roster

Schedule

|-
!colspan=12 style=""| Exhibition
|-

|-
!colspan=12 style=""| Non-conference regular season

|-
!colspan=12 style=""| Mountain West regular season

|-
!colspan=12 style=""| 

 All home games where a television provider is not indicated are televised on the Mountain West Network.

See also
 2017–18 San Jose State Spartans men's basketball team

References

San Jose State Spartans women's basketball seasons
San Jose State